Jean Stewart may refer to:

 Lady Jean Stewart (c. 1533–1587/88), illegitimate daughter of King James V of Scotland
 Jean Stewart, Lady Bargany (died 1605), Scottish lady in waiting to Anne of Denmark
 Jean Stewart (violist) (1914–2002), English viola player
 Jean Stewart (swimmer) (1930–2020), New Zealand swimmer
 Jean Stewart (writer), American author of science fiction novels